According to the beliefs of the Church of Jesus Christ of Latter-day Saints,  Zarahemla refers to a large city in the ancient Americas which is described in the Book of Mormon. Archaeologists and historians have not been able to archaeologically verify a location for any such city. (See Archaeology and the Book of Mormon for more detail about the archaeological debate between Mormons and archaeologists.)

Mormon studies

Some Mormons speculate that the name "Zarahemla" is a compound Biblical Hebrew name   Zéraʻ Ḥemlah meaning "seed of compassion". Others interpret the name differently.

Hugh Nibley relates the name to a 'red city'

It always got me because there's an important trading centre in the middle of the Sahara that goes by the name of 'Dar Al-Hamra' which means 'the Red City'. Of course it depends on the dialect. Zarahemla means 'red city', but what attracts me about it is that the Hopis say that their people came from the 'great red city of the south' when it was destroyed.
Numerous LDS scholars have attempted to link Zarahemla to a real world location. For example, archaeologist John L. Sorenson has listed numerous correlations with the archaeological site of Santa Rosa in Mesoamerica with the Book of Mormon city.

Narrative

According to the Book of Mormon, the Nephite Mosiah and his followers "discovered that the people of Zarahemla came out from Jerusalem at the time that Zedekiah king of Judah, was carried away captive into Babylon" (about 587 B.C.). The Book of Mormon relates that the surviving seed of Zedekiah "journeyed in the wilderness, and were brought by the hand of the Lord across the great waters" to the Western Hemisphere. The book of Omni in the Book of Mormon tells how Zarahemla and his people came to settle the land of Zarahemla in the New World. Mosiah and his refugee people presumably united with the people of Zarahemla sometime between 279 and 130 B.C. "Mosiah was appointed to be their king." Mosiah thereafter presided in the land of Zarahemla over a people called collectively "the Nephites". The Land of Zarahemla was the Nephite capital for many years.

Notable Book of Mormon descendants of the leader Zarahemla include Ammon the venturer and Coriantumr the dissenter. Ammon led a quest in search of a colony that had left the land of Zarahemla in order to resettle a city named Lehi-Nephi. The dissenter Coriantumr led the Lamanites in battle against the Nephites in the first century B.C.

At some point before Mosiah discovered Zarahemla, the people of Zarahemla had discovered Coriantumr (not to be confused with the later Nephite dissenter of the same name). According to the Book of Mormon, Coriantumr was the last of a destroyed nation called the Jaredites. Coriantumr stayed with the people of Zarahemla "for the space of nine moons" before dying and being buried by them.

Benjamin succeeded his father Mosiah as the second Nephite king of Zarahemla. King Benjamin was victorious in driving Lamanites enemies from the Zarahemla region.

At the time of the crucifixion of Christ, the Book of Mormon records that "there were exceedingly sharp lightnings, such as never had been known in all the land. And the city of Zarahemla did take fire."  "And it came to pass that there was a voice heard among all the inhabitants of the earth ... 'because of their iniquity and abominations ... that great city Zarahemla have I burned with fire, and the inhabitants thereof ... I am Jesus Christ, the Son of God.'" (3 Nephi, 9: 1, 2, 3, 15.)  The Book of Mormon indicates that "the great city of Zarahemla" was rebuilt sometime in the first century A.D. As his doomed nation retreated northward from their enemies, the 4th century prophet and historian Mormon recorded that Nephite "towns, and villages, and cities were burned with fire." The Book of Mormon does not indicate whether the city of Zarahemla survived to be occupied by Lamanites after the destruction of the Nephite nation.

In Mormon culture

The name "Zarahemla" was given to a small Mormon settlement across the Mississippi River from Nauvoo.  In August 1841 a conference was held there during which John Smith was sustained as president of the stake in Iowa, with David Pettigrew and M. C. Nickerson as his counselors. The stake was dissolved three years later; a second stake for Iowa would not be organized until 1966.

Zarahemla was the original name of Blanchardville, Wisconsin, founded in the 1840s by James Strang's Strangite Mormons.  The village received its present name after it was platted in 1857.

The 1970 album Axe by Canadian musician Randy Bachman features a song called "Zarahemla". The song is an instrumental and thus features no lyrics, but Bachman is a member of the LDS Church.

References

Book of Mormon places